Eustromula is a genus of beetles in the family Cerambycidae, containing the following species: The name was proposed by Cockerell as a replacement for a preoccupied name, "Eustroma."

 Eustromula keiferi Linsley, 1934
 Eustromula valida (LeConte, 1858)

References

Elaphidiini